Rector is a surname. Notable people with the surname include:

Ab Rector (1934–2005), Canadian politician
Alan Rector, professor of medical informatics
Anne Elizabeth Rector (1899–1970), American artist and author
Chris Rector (b. 1951), American Politician
Eddie Rector (1890–1962), African American tap dancer of the Vaudeville era
Edward F. Rector (1916–2001), United States Air Force
Elias W. Rector (1849–1917), American politician
Enoch J. Rector (1863–1957), American boxing film promoter
Floyd Rector, nephrologist and emeritus professor of medicine
George Rector (1870s–1947), restaurateur and raconteur
Giovanni Rector (b. 1982), South African association football player
Hartman Rector Jr. (1924–2018), American Latter Day Saints leader
Henry Massey Rector (1816–1899), governor of Arkansas
Jamaica Rector (b. 1981), American football player
James Rector (1884–1949), athlete
James Rector (student),  "Bloody Thursday" victim
James Ward Rector (1903–1979), American jurist
Jeff Rector (born 1958), American actor
Joe A. Rector (1935–2012), American/Cherokee artist
Josephine Rector (1885–1958), American scriptwriter and actress
Liam Rector (1949–2007), American poet
Michael Rector (born 1993), American football wide receiver 
Ricky Ray Rector (1950–1992), executed murderer
Robert Rector, American author
Ron Rector (1944–1968), American football player
Sarah Rector (1902–1967), Member of the Muscogee (Creek) Nation, best known for being the "Richest Colored Girl in the world" or the "Millionaire girl a member of the race"
Tracy Rector (born 1972), American filmmaker, curator, and arts advocate

Latin-language surnames
English-language surnames
Occupational surnames
English-language occupational surnames